San Antonio B-cycle is a privately owned for-profit public bicycle sharing system that serves San Antonio. In operation since March 26, 2011, it is the largest bike sharing program in Texas and the second largest bike sharing program in the B-Cycle program.

As of June 2013, the San Antonio B-cycle system consisted of 42 stations and over 400 bikes. By the end of 2013, 11 more stations will be added which will increase the bike count to 450.

In 2014, B-Cycle will expand to 68 stations and 600 bikes.

History 

San Antonio B-cycle was the first bike share program to be launched in Texas. The first phase of San Antonio B-cycle was launched on March 26, 2011. In the first six months of operation, San Antonio B-cyclers took over 16,000 trips and generated 857 annual passes and 2,795 day passes.

See also 
B-cycle
List of bicycle sharing systems

References

External links 
San Antonio B-cycle

Community bicycle programs
San Antonio
Bicycle sharing in the United States